Kaolinonychus is a genus of harvestman in the family Paranonychidae. There are about five described species in Kaolinonychus, endemic to South Korea and found primarily in caves.

Species
These five species belong to the genus Kaolinonychus:
 Kaolinonychus coreanus (Suzuki, 1966)
 Kaolinonychus daisenensis Suzuki, 1975
 Kaolinonychus iriei Suzuki, 1975
 Kaolinonychus iyanus Suzuki, 1975
 Kaolinonychus tomishimai Suzuki, 1975

References

Further reading

 
 
 

Harvestmen